Graffenrieda caudata is a species of plant in the family Melastomataceae. It is endemic to Guyana.

References

caudata
Endemic flora of Guyana
Vulnerable plants
Taxonomy articles created by Polbot